Cathedral of Our Lady of Lourdes or Our Lady of Lourdes Cathedral may refer to:

Our Lady of Lourdes Cathedral, Daegu, South Korea
Our Lady of Lourdes Cathedral, Florencia, Colombia
Our Lady of Lourdes Cathedral, Maradi, Niger
Cathedral of Our Lady of Lourdes (Canela), Brazil
Cathedral of Our Lady of Lourdes (Spokane, Washington), United States
Our Lady of Lourdes Metropolitan Cathedral, Thrissur
Our Lady of Lourdes Cathedral, Nakhon Ratchasima, Thailand.

See also
Our Lady of Lourdes Church (disambiguation)